This is a list of museums in Norway.

By County

Akershus
Eidsvollsbygningen
Henie-Onstad Art Centre
Kjeller Airport
Norwegian Armed Forces Aircraft Collection
Oscarsborg Fortress
Urskog–Høland Line

Aust-Agder
Lillesand Town- and Maritime Museum
Rygnestadtunet
Tveitetunet

Buskerud
Ål Bygdamuseum
Blaafarveværket
Dagali Museum
Drammen Museum of Art and Cultural History
Gol Bygdetun
Gulskogen Manor
Hallingdal Museum
Hemsedal Bygdetun
Kongsberg Skiing Museum
Krøderen Line

Finnmark
Alta Museum
Royal and Ancient Polar Bear Society
Museum of Reconstruction
Tirpitz Museum

Hedmark
Hedmark Museum
Norwegian Railway Museum
Norwegian Motorhistorical Museum

Hordaland
Alvøen
Bergen Museum
Bergenhus Fortress
Bryggens Museum
Buekorps Museum
Coastal Museum in Øygarden
Damsgård Manor
Fjell Fortress
Gamlehaugen
Hanseatic Museum and Schøtstuene
Hardanger Fartøyvernsenter
Hardanger Folkemuseum
Hardangervidda Natursenter
Lydgalleriet
Lysøen
Norwegian Fisheries Museum
Norwegian Museum of Hydropower and Industry
Old Voss Line
Sunnhordland Museum
Troldhaugen
Ryvarden Lighthouse
Voss Folkemuseum
Western Norway Emigration Center

Møre og Romsdal
Jugendstilsenteret
Nordmøre Museum
Romsdal Museum
Ytste Skotet

Nord-Trøndelag
Hegra Fortress
Norwegian Sawmill Museum

Nordland
Knut Hamsun Centre
Lofoten Stockfish Museum
Lofotr Viking Museum
Norwegian Fishing Village Museum
Salten Museum

Oppland
Aulestad
Bagn Bygdesamling
Bautahaugen Samlinger
Fieldfare Cabin
Hadeland Folkemuseum
Hol Bygdemuseum
Lands Museum
Lillehammer Art Museum
Maihaugen
Norwegian Olympic Museum
Valdres Folkemuseum

Oslo
Armed Forces Museum (Norway)
Astrup Fearnley Museum of Modern Art
University Botanical Garden (Oslo)
Museum of Cultural History, Oslo
Fram Museum
Galleri Rom
Holmenkollen Ski Museum
Høstutstillingen
Norwegian Center for Studies of Holocaust and Religious Minorities
Ibsen Museum (Oslo)
Jewish Museum in Oslo
Kon-Tiki Museum
Munch Museum
National Museum of Art, Architecture and Design
National Gallery of Norway
Norwegian Museum of Contemporary Art
Norwegian Museum of Decorative Arts and Design
Natural History Museum at the University of Oslo
Nobel Peace Center
Nordic Bible Museum
Norway's Resistance Museum
Norwegian Maritime Museum
Norwegian Museum of Cultural History
Norwegian Museum of Science and Technology
Oscarshall
Oslo City Museum
Oslo Police Museum
Oslo Tramway Museum
Paleontologisk Museum
Stenersen Museum
Vigeland Museum
Viking Ship Museum (Oslo)

Rogaland
Flyhistorisk Museum, Sola
Garborg Centre
Karmsund Folkemuseum
Norwegian Petroleum Museum
The Science Factory
Stavanger Museum
Tungenes Lighthouse

Sogn og Fjordane
Anders Svor Museum
Astruptunet
Breheimsenteret
The Heiberg Collections
Jostedalsbreen nasjonalparksenter
Nordfjord Folkemuseum
Norwegian Glacier Museum
Norwegian Museum of Travel and Tourism
Sunnfjord Museum

Sør-Trøndelag
Austrått
Museene i Sør-Trøndelag
NTNU Museum of Natural History and Archaeology
Norsk Døvemuseum
Orkla Industrimuseum
Thamshavn Line
Ringve Museum
Sverresborg
The Norwegian National Museum of Justice
Trondheim Science Museum
Trondheim Tramway Museum

Telemark
Heddal Open Air Museum
Norwegian Industrial Workers Museum
Telemark Museum

Troms
Arctic-alpine Botanic Garden
Northern Norway Art Museum
Polaria
Tromsø University Museum
Trondenes Historical Center

Vest-Agder
Agder Natural History Museum and Botanical Garden
Kristiansand Cannon Museum
Lindesnes Lighthouse
Setesdal Line
Sørlandets Art Museum
Vest-Agder Museum Kristiansand

Vestfold
Eidsfos Verk
Holmestrand Aluminium Museum
Preus Museum
:no:Midgard historik senter
Royal Norwegian Navy Museum
Sandefjord Museum
Southern Actor

Østfold
Borgarsyssel Museum
Elingård

Svalbard
Barentsburg Pomor Museum
Ny-Ålesund Town and Mine Museum
Pyramiden Museum
Spitsbergen Airship Museum

See also 

 List of museums
 Tourism in Norway
 Culture of Norway

Museums
 
Norway
Museums
Museums
Norway